A reference interview is a conversation between a librarian and a library user, usually at a reference desk, in which the librarian responds to the user's initial explanation of his or her information need by first attempting to clarify that need and then by directing the user to appropriate information resources.

Definition
Bopp & Smith (1995) defines the reference interview as the "conversation between a member of the library reference staff and a library user for the purpose of clarifying the user’s needs and aiding the user in meeting those needs".

According to ODLIS, the reference interview is "the interpersonal communication that occurs between a reference librarian and a library user to determine the person's specific information need(s), which may turn out to be different from the reference question as initially posed...A reference interview may occur in person, by telephone, or electronically (usually via e-mail) at the request of the user, but a well-trained reference librarian will sometimes initiate communication if a hesitant user appears to need assistance".

Stephen Abram finds the library as conversation a vital component to the profession. In regards to the reference question, "Our core skills are the skills and competencies required to improve the quality of the question."

Parts of a reference interview 

The reference interview is structured to help the librarian provide answers to the library user. In general, the interview is composed of the following stages.

Welcoming
Gathering general information from the user and getting an overview of the problem
Confirming the exact question
Intervention, such as giving information, advice or instructions
Finishing, including feedback and summary

These stages may occur in loops, for example when a clarification of the question leads to the need to establish more background information on the query topic. These steps are designed to put the user at their ease, and then help ensure that they have correctly explained what they require. When the reference librarian believes that the query is fully understood, they attempt to provide resources that help satisfy it. An important and often overlooked final step is checking that the information or service provided was indeed what the library user required.

Reference interview techniques
The purpose behind the reference interview structure is to ensure that the library user's information need is satisfied. The librarian can use a number of interview techniques to help identify the user's exact need. Poor reference interview skills may lead to misinterpretation of the real question, a lack of real help and an unsatisfied library user.

Librarians use many techniques to help identify a user's information need. With body language, repetition and paraphrasing of what the user says, the interviewer can encourage the user to give more information about what they need. Asking open questions establishes context and helps to identify exactly what is required. A lack of follow-up, or checking that the user found what they required, is arguably one of the most common mistakes made in the reference interview.

Forming the query
One of the biggest problems with providing an effective reference service is that of badly formed queries. In this instance, the user's reference question doesn't match up to the information they actually need. Badly formed queries may lead to user frustration, as they perceive that the reference interview is not solving their problem.

Many of the techniques used in the reference interview are geared towards developing a badly formed query until a sense of the user's true information need is gained. A great degree of care must be taken when helping users to develop their query. The librarian typically has little insight into the social and psychological barriers that might be preventing the user from explaining their question accurately. Anything from anxiety from an approaching deadline to lack of confidence with language can get in the way.

The digital reference interview

 
Digital reference is a reference service initiated electronically, often in real-time. The initial meeting between a patron and librarian is not face-to-face, though queries mutate and may later take place at a physical reference desk. Virtual reference services can be conducted in internet chat, videoconferencing, email, co-browsing and instant messaging. Unlike the in person reference interview, digital reference might not be a synchronous pursuit.

Initial uptake of virtual reference was not as swift as some had predicted. The complexity of virtual reference may have partly been to blame, as users want information quickly and with the minimum of fuss. Some evidence suggested that the problem lies with poor uptake and training among library staff.

Library users and reference services
Library users are not always comfortable with reference services, let alone satisfied with them. Unobtrusive user studies suggest that only around 55% to 65% of users leave a reference interview satisfied with the result and willing to return. Demographics, social factors and users’ preconceptions about libraries all contribute to this figure. Embarrassment, shyness, and anxiety can prevent a user from approaching the reference desk, and poor signposting and explanation of services can mean that some customers aren't aware that the reference service exists. To be as effective as possible, libraries must be proactive in publicizing their services and reducing the stigma of asking for help.

Usefulness of the reference interview
For a long time, the value of the reference interview has stood unquestioned. More recently, with technological developments streamlining some of the tasks which once comprised the interview, some researchers are beginning to question the validity of the reference interview, and the investment that a reference librarian represents. Others argue that reference services should broaden their target audience. As people increasingly use the internet to make major, life-affecting decisions, so they also require the services of  professionals who are able to provide help in this environment. If this proves to be the case, it will become more vital that the reference interview be conducted professionally and successfully. In the age of information overload, a successful reference interview may empower users to confidently make such decisions in their lives.

See also 
Five whys (repeated questioning to discover a root cause)
Information-seeking behavior
Library reference desk
Reference scenarios
XY problem (users asking for Y wrongly believing it will solve the real problem X)

References

Citations

Further reading 
 Jennerich, Elaine Z. and Jennerich, Edward J. (1997). The Reference Interview as a Creative Art. Westport, CT: Libraries Unlimited.
 Katz, William A. (2001). Introduction to Reference Work, Vol. 1: Basic Information Services. 8th Ed. New York : McGraw-Hill.
 Katz, William A. (2001). Introduction to Reference Work, Vol. 2: Reference Services and Reference Processes. 8th Ed. New York : McGraw-Hill.

External links 
Ohio Reference Excellence
Guidelines for Behavioral Performance of Reference and Information Service Providers

Library resources
Reference